Hector Odhar MacLean of Lochbuie, 9th Chief (1575–1628) was the 9th Chief of Clan Maclaine of Lochbuie.

Biography
Hector Odhar, ninth Maclean of Lochbuie, married the only daughter of Sir Lachlan Mor Maclean of Duart.

Hector Odhar died about 1628, leaving two sons, Murdoch Mor MacLean of Lochbuie, 10th Chief, his heir, and Lachainn Mor MacLean of Lochbuie. He had a daughter, Margaret, who married Donald Macquarrie of Ormaig.

Children
Murdoch Mor MacLean of Lochbuie, 10th Chief
Lachainn Mor MacLean of Lochbuie
Margaret MacLean of Lochbuie, who was married to Donald Macquarrie of Ormaig
Allan McLean (MacLaine) progenitor of Maclaine of Kilmory and Scarba

References

Clan Maclaine of Lochbuie